In geometry, the Parry point is a special point associated with a plane triangle. It is the triangle center designated X(111) in Clark Kimberling's Encyclopedia of Triangle Centers. The Parry point and Parry circle are named in honor of the English geometer Cyril Parry, who studied them in the early 1990s.

Parry circle

Let ABC be a plane triangle. The circle through the centroid and the two isodynamic points of triangle ABC is called the Parry circle of triangle ABC. The equation of the Parry circle in barycentric coordinates is

The center of the Parry circle is also a triangle center. It is the center designated as X(351) in Encyclopedia of Triangle Centers. The trilinear coordinates of the center of the Parry circle are

where

Parry point
The Parry circle and the circumcircle of triangle ABC intersect in two points. One of them is a focus of the Kiepert parabola of triangle ABC.  The other point of intersection is called the Parry point of triangle ABC.

The trilinear coordinates of the Parry point are

The point of intersection of the Parry circle and the circumcircle of triangle ABC which is a focus of the Kiepert hyperbola of triangle ABC is  also a triangle center and it is designated as X(110) in Encyclopedia of Triangle Centers. The trilinear coordinates of this triangle center are

See also
 Lester circle

References

Triangle centers